The 2013–14 Rice Owls women's basketball team represents Rice University during the 2013–14 NCAA Division I women's basketball season. The Owls, led by eighth year head coach Greg Williams, play their home games at the Tudor Fieldhouse and were members of Conference USA. They finished the season with a record of 13–17 overall, 6–10 in C-USA play for a 3 way tie for ninth place. They lost in the first round of the 2014 Conference USA women's basketball tournament to FIU.

Roster

Schedule

|-
!colspan=9| Regular Season

|-
!colspan=9| 2014 Conference USA women's basketball tournament

See also
2013–14 Rice Owls men's basketball team

References

Rice Owls women's basketball seasons
Rice